The Running Man is a Canadian television film, directed by Donald Brittain and broadcast in 1981 as an episode of the CBC Television drama anthology For the Record. It was Brittain's first narrative fiction film in a career making documentary films, and the first Canadian television film ever to explicitly address the subject of homosexuality.

The film stars Chuck Shamata as Ben Garfield, a married teacher struggling to come to terms with his own sexuality after one of his students comes out as gay. The film also stars Barbara Gordon as his wife Liz and Don Scanlon as his openly gay friend Michael, as well as Colm Feore, Kate Trotter and Linda Sorenson.

David Mole of The Body Politic covered the film's production, criticizing it heavily for being a film about homosexuality made by non-gay filmmakers. Rick Groen of The Globe and Mail wrote that the film "never actually stumbles. But, after a quick sprint out of the blocks, it settles for cruising to the tape with a disappointing time."

The film won three Bijou Awards in 1981, for Best Actor in a Non-Feature (Shamata), Best Director of a Drama (Brittain) and Best Sound (Ed Chong).

References

External links

CBC Television original films
Canadian LGBT-related television films
1981 LGBT-related films
LGBT-related drama films
1981 television films
1981 films
Films directed by Donald Brittain
English-language Canadian films
Canadian drama television films
1980s Canadian films